The full structure of the Polish Land Forces is:

Armed Forces General Command 
The Inspector Land Forces, a two-star, major-general equivalent, reports to Commander, Armed Forces General Command, a three-star, general broni.

Separately and without seemingly any responsibility to the Inspector Land Forces, the divisions of the Polish Land Forces also report, separately, to the Commander, Armed Forces General Command.

11th Armoured Cavalry Division 

  11th Lubusz Land Armoured Cavalry Division "King Jan III Sobieski" (nicknamed The Black Division), in Żagań
  11th Staff Battalion, in Żagań
  10th Armoured Cavalry Brigade "Lt.-Gen. Stanisław Maczek", in Świętoszów
 Command Battalion
 1st Tank Battalion with Leopard 2A4 main battle tanks
 24th Uhlan Battalion with Leopard 2A4 main battle tanks
 10th Mechanised Dragoon Battalion with BWP-1 infantry fighting vehicles
 Self-propelled Artillery Group with 2S1 Gvozdika 122mm self-propelled howitzers
 Anti-aircraft Group with ZSU-23-4MP Biała anti-aircraft systems and Grom surface-to-air missiles
 10th Reconnaissance Company with BRDM-2 vehicles
 Engineer Company 
 Logistic Battalion
  17th Greater Poland Mechanised Brigade "Lt.-Gen. Józef Dowbor-Muśnicki", in Międzyrzecz
 Command Battalion, in Międzyrzecz
 1st Motorised Infantry Battalion "Rzeszów", in Międzyrzecz with KTO Rosomak infantry fighting vehicles
 7th Mounted Rifle Battalion "Wielkopolska"in Wędrzyn with KTO Rosomak infantry fighting vehicles
 15th Uhlan Battalion "Poznań", in Wedrzyn with KTO Rosomak infantry fighting vehicles
 7th Horse Artillery Group "Wielkopolska", in Wedrzyn with SpGH DANA 152mm self-propelled howitzers
 7th Anti-aircraft Group, in Wedrzyn with Hibneryt anti-aircraft systems and Grom surface-to-air missiles
 5th Engineer Battalion, in Krosno Odrzańskie
 Reconnaissance Company "Wielkopolska Uhlans", in Międzyrzecz
 Logistic Battalion, in Międzyrzecz
  34th Armoured Cavalry Brigade "Grand Crown Hetman Jan Zamoyski", in Żagań
 Command Battalion
 1st Tank Battalion "Brabant" with T-72M1 main battle tanks
 2nd Tank Battalion "Flanders" with T-72M1 main battle tanks
 Mechanised Battalion with BWP-1 infantry fighting vehicles
 Self-propelled Artillery Group with 2S1 Gvozdika 122mm self-propelled howitzers
 Anti-aircraft Group "Dresden" with ZSU-23-4MP Biała anti-aircraft systems and Grom surface-to-air missiles
 Reconnaissance Company with BRDM-2 vehicles
 Engineer Company 
 Logistic Battalion
  23rd Silesian Artillery Regiment, in Bolesławiec
 Command Battery
 1st Self-propelled Artillery Group with SpGH DANA 152mm self-propelled howitzers
 2nd Rocket Artillery Group with WR-40 Langusta multiple rocket launchers
 3rd Rocket Artillery Group with RM-70 multiple rocket launchers
 4th Rocket Artillery Group with BM-21 Grad multiple rocket launchers (to be replaced with WR-40 Langusta)
 Logistic Battalion
 Engineer Company
  4th Zielona Góra Anti-Aircraft Regiment "Maj.-Gen. Stefan Rowecki „Grot”", in Czerwieńsk
 Command Battery, in Czerwieńsk
 1st Anti-Aircraft Group, in Leszno with 2K12 Kub surface-to-air missiles
 2nd Anti-Aircraft Group, in Czerwieńsk with 9K33 Osa surface-to-air missiles
 3rd Anti-Aircraft Group, in Czerwieńsk with 9K33 Osa surface-to-air missiles
 4th Anti-Aircraft Group, in Leszno with Grom surface-to-air missiles
 Logistic Battalion, in Czerwieńsk
 11th Logistic Regiment, in Żagań (being formed)
 Maintenance Battalion, in Żagań
 Transport Battalion, in Żagań
 Supply Battalion, in Żagań
 Medical Support Group, in Żagań

12th Mechanised Division 

 12th Szczecin Mechanised Division "Bolesław III Krzywousty", in Szczecin
 12th Staff Battalion, in Szczecin
 2nd Polish Legionaries Mechanised Brigade "Marshal Józef Piłsudski", in Złocieniec
 Command Battalion
 Tank Battalion with PT-91 Twardy main battle tanks
 1st Mechanised Battalion with BWP-1 infantry fighting vehicles
 2nd Mechanised Battalion with BWP-1 infantry fighting vehicles
 Self-propelled Artillery Group with 2S1 Gvozdika 122mm self-propelled howitzers
 Anti-aircraft Group with Hibneryt anti-aircraft systems and Grom surface-to-air missiles
 Reconnaissance Company with BRDM-2 vehicles
 Engineer Company 
 Logistic Battalion
 7th Pomeranian Coastal Defense Brigade "Brig. Gen. Stanisław Grzmot-Skotnicki", in Słupsk
 Command Battalion, in Słupsk
 1st Mechanised Battalion, in Lębork with BWP-1 infantry fighting vehicles
 2nd Mechanised Battalion, in Słupsk with BWP-1 infantry fighting vehicles
 3rd Academic Legion Mechanised Battalion, in Trzebiatów with BWP-1 infantry fighting vehicles
 Artillery Group with 2S1 Gvozdika 122mm self-propelled howitzers
 Anti-aircraft Group with Hibneryt anti-aircraft systems and Grom surface-to-air missiles
 Reconnaissance Company
 Engineer Company 
 Logistic Battalion
 12th Mechanised Brigade "Lt.-Gen. Józef Haller", in Szczecin
 Command Battalion, in Szczecin
 1st Motorized Infantry Battalion, in Szczecin with KTO Rosomak infantry fighting vehicles
 2nd Motorized Infantry Battalion, in Stargard with KTO Rosomak infantry fighting vehicles
 14th Uhlan Battalion, in Stargard with KTO Rosomak infantry fighting vehicles
 Self-propelled Artillery Group, in Choszczno with 24x SpGH DANA 152mm self-propelled howitzers
 Anti-aircraft Group, in Stargard with Hibneryt anti-aircraft systems and Grom surface-to-air missiles
 2nd Engineer Battalion, in Stargard
 Reconnaissance Company, in Szczecin with BRDM-2 vehicles
 Logistic Battalion, in Szczecin
 5th Lubusz Land Artillery Regiment, in Sulechów
 Command Battery
 1st Self-propelled Artillery Group with SpGH DANA 152mm self-propelled howitzers
 2nd Self-propelled Artillery Group with AHS Krab 155mm self-propelled howitzers
 3rd Rocket Artillery Group with WR-40 Langusta multiple rocket launchers
 4th Rocket Artillery Group with BM-21 Grad multiple rocket launchers
 Logistic Battalion
 Engineer Company
 8th Koszalin Anti-Aircraft Regiment, in Koszalin
 Command Battery
 1st Anti-Aircraft Group with 2K12 Kub surface-to-air missiles
 2nd Anti-Aircraft Group with 9K33 Osa surface-to-air missiles
 3rd Anti-Aircraft Group with 9K33 Osa surface-to-air missiles
 4th Anti-Aircraft Group with Grom surface-to-air missiles
 Logistic Battalion
 8th Logistic Regiment, in Kołobrzeg (being formed)
 Maintenance Battalion, in Kołobrzeg
 Transport Battalion, in Kołobrzeg
 Supply Battalion, in Kołobrzeg
 Medical Support Group, in Kołobrzeg

16th Mechanised Division 

 16th Pomeranian Mechanised Division "Casimir IV Jagiellon", in Olsztyn
 16th Staff Battalion, in Olsztyn
9th Armoured Cavalry Brigade "King Stefan Báthory", in Braniewo
 Command Battalion
 1st Tank Battalion with PT-91 Twardy main battle tanks
 2nd Tank Battalion with PT-91 Twardy main battle tanks
 3rd Mechanised Battalion with BWP-1 infantry fighting vehicles
 Self-propelled Artillery Group with 2S1 Gvozdika 122mm self-propelled howitzers
 Anti-aircraft Group with ZSU-23-4MP Biała anti-aircraft systems and Grom surface-to-air missiles
 Reconnaissance Company with BRDM-2 vehicles
 Engineer Company
 Logistic Battalion
15th Giżycko Mechanised Brigade "Zawisza Czarny", in Giżycko
 Command Battalion, in Giżycko
 1st Tank Battalion, in Orzysz with PT-91 Twardy main battle tanks
 1st Mechanised Battalion, in Orzysz with BWP-1 infantry fighting vehicles
 2nd Mechanised Battalion, in Giżycko with BWP-1 infantry fighting vehicles
 Self-propelled Artillery Group, in Orzysz with 2S1 Gvozdika 122mm self-propelled howitzers
 Anti-aircraft Group, in Orzysz with ZUR-23-2 kg "Jodek-G" anti-aircraft systems and Grom surface-to-air missiles
 15th Engineer Battalion, in Orzysz
 Reconnaissance Company, in Giżycko with BRDM-2 vehicles
 Logistic Battalion, in Giżycko
20th Mechanized Brigade in Morąg/Ostróda
 Command Battalion, in Bartoszyce
 1st Tank Battalion, in Morąg with PT-91 Twardy main battle tanks
 1st Mechanised Battalion, in Bartoszyce with BWP-1 infantry fighting vehicles
 2nd Mechanised Battalion, in Morąg with BWP-1 infantry fighting vehicles
 Self-propelled Artillery Group with 2S1 Gvozdika 122mm self-propelled howitzers
 Anti-aircraft Group with ZUR-23-2 kg "Jodek-G" anti-aircraft systems and Grom surface-to-air missiles
 Reconnaissance Company with BRDM-2 vehicles
 Engineer Company
 Logistic Battalion
1st Masurian Artillery Brigade, in Węgorzewo/Olecko
 Command Battery
 1st Self-propelled Artillery Group with SpGH DANA 152mm self-propelled howitzers
 1st Self-propelled Artillery Group with AHS Krab 155mm self-propelled howitzers
 3rd Rocket Artillery Group with WR-40 Langusta multiple rocket launchers
 4th Rocket Artillery Group with BM-21 Grad multiple rocket launchers (to be replaced with WR-40 Langusta)
 Engineer Company
 Logistic Battalion
15th Gołdap Anti-Aircraft Regiment, in Gołdap
 Command Battery
 1st Anti-Aircraft Group with 2K12 Kub surface-to-air missiles
 2nd Anti-Aircraft Group, in Elbląg with 2K12 Kub surface-to-air missiles (to be replaced with Mała Narew in spring 2023)
 3rd Anti-Aircraft Group with Hibneryt anti-aircraft systems and Grom surface-to-air missiles
 Logistic Battalion
 16th Logistic Regiment, in Elbląg
 Maintenance Battalion, in Elbląg
 Transport Battalion, in Elbląg
 Supply Battalion, in Elbląg
 Medical Support Group, in Elbląg

18th Mechanised Division 

 18th Mechanised Division (nicknamed The Iron Division), in Siedlce
 18th Staff Battalion, in Siedlce
 1st Warsaw Armoured Brigade "Tadeusz Kościuszko", in Wesoła
 Command Battalion, in Wesoła
 1st Tank Battalion, in Wesoła with Leopard 2A5 main battle tanks
 2nd Tank Battalion, in Wesoła with Leopard 2A5 main battle tanks
 1st Mechanised Battalion, in Biała Podlaska with BWP-1 infantry fighting vehicles
 2nd Mechanised Battalion, in Biała Podlaska with BWP-1 infantry fighting vehicles
 Self-propelled Artillery Group, in Siedlce with AHS Krab 155mm self-propelled howitzers
 Anti-aircraft Group, in Siedlce with ZUR-23-2 kg "Jodek-G" anti-aircraft systems and Grom surface-to-air missiles
 Reconnaissance Company, in Biała Podlaska with BRDM-2 vehicles
 Engineer Company, in Biała Podlaska
 Logistic Battalion, in Wesoła
 19th Lublin Mechanized Brigade "Franciszek Kleeberg", in Lublin (activated 1 October 2019, full operational capability, in 2022)
 19th Command Battalion, in Lublin
 1st Tank Battalion, in Żurawica with T-72M1 main battle tanks
 19th Tank Battalion, in Lublin with T-72M1 main battle tanks
 3rd Mechanised Battalion, in Zamość with BWP-1 infantry fighting vehicles
 19th Mechanised Battalion, in Chełm with BWP-1 infantry fighting vehicles
 19th Self-propelled Artillery Group, in Chełm with 2S1 Gvozdika 122mm self-propelled howitzers
 19th Anti-aircraft Group, in Lublin with ZUR-23-2 kg "Jodek-G" anti-aircraft systems and Grom surface-to-air missiles
 Reconnaissance Company, with BRDM-2 vehicles
 Engineer Company, in Chełm
 Logistic Battalion
 21st Podhale Rifles Brigade "Mieczysław Boruta-Spiechowicz", in Rzeszów
 21st Command Battalion, in Rzeszów
 1st Podhale Rifles Battalion, in Rzeszow with BWP-1 infantry fighting vehicles
 3rd Podhale Rifles Battalion, in Przemyśl with BWP-1 infantry fighting vehicles
 5th Podhale Rifles Battalion, in Przemyśl with BWP-1 infantry fighting vehicles
 22nd Carpathian Mountains Infantry Battalion, in Kłodzko with BWP-1 infantry fighting vehicles
 14th Self-propelled Artillery Group, in Jarosław with 2S1 Gvozdika self-propelled howitzers
 21st Anti-aircraft Group, in Jarosław with Hibneryt anti-aircraft systems and Grom surface-to-air missiles
 Reconnaissance Company, in Rzeszów with BRDM-2 vehicles (subordinated to the 21st Command Battalion)
 16th Engineer Battalion, in Nisko
 21st Logistic Battalion, in Rzeszów
 18th Artillery Regiment, in Nowa Dęba (being formed)
 18th Anti-Aircraft Regiment, in Sitaniec
 Command Battery
 1st Anti-aircraft Group, in Sitaniec with Poprad self-propelled surface-air-missile system]]
 2nd Anti-aircraft Group, in Zamość with Mała Narew surface-air-missile system
 3rd Anti-aircraft Group (being formed, with MIM-104 Patriot surface-air-missile system)
 Logistic Battery
 18th Logistic Regiment, in Łomża (being formed)
 Maintenance Battalion, in Łomża
 Transport Battalion, in Łomża
 Supply Battalion, in Łomża
 Medical Support Group, in Łomża
 18th Reconnaissance Battalion, in Przasnysz

1st Army Aviation Brigade 
 1st Army Aviation Brigade, in Inowrocław
 49th Air Base, in Pruszcz Gdański
 1st Squadron with 12x Mi-24W attack helicopters
 2nd Squadron with 12x Mi-2URP attack helicopters
 3rd Squadron with 16x Mi-2 NVG training helicopters
 56th Air Base, in Inowrocław
 1st Squadron with 12x Mi-24W attack helicopters
 2nd Squadron with 12x Mi-2URP attack helicopters
 3rd Squadron with 8x PZL W-3PL Głuszec combat search and rescue helicopters
 Air Reconnaissance Squadron, in Mirosławiec with 45x Orbiter unmanned aerial vehicles

6th Airborne Brigade 

 6th Airborne Brigade "Brig. Gen. Stanisław Sosabowski", in Kraków
 6th Command Battalion, in Kraków
 6th Airborne Battalion, in Gliwice
 16th Airborne Battalion, in Kraków
 18th Airborne Battalion, in Bielsko-Biała
 6th Logistic Battalion, in Kraków

25th Air Cavalry Brigade 
 25th Air Cavalry Brigade "Prince Józef Poniatowski", in Tomaszów Mazowiecki
 25th Command Battalion, in Tomaszów Mazowiecki
 1st Air Cavalry Battalion, in Leźnica Wielka
 7th Air Cavalry Battalion, in Tomaszów Mazowiecki
 1st Aviation Group, in Leźnica Wielka
 1st Squadron with 16x Mi-8T transport helicopters
 2nd Squadron with 16x Mi-17-1V transport helicopters
 7th Aviation Group, in Nowy Glinnik
 1st Squadron with 12x PZL W-3WA Sokół armed transport helicopters
 2nd Squadron with 12x PZL W-3WA Sokół armed transport helicopters
 Air Medical Evacuation Unit, in Nowy Glinnik with 2x PZL W-3WA AE Sokół and 2x Mi-17AE medical evacuation helicopters
 25th Logistic Battalion, in Tomaszów Mazowiecki

Directly reporting regiments 

 2nd Hrubieszów Reconnaissance Regiment "Maj. Henryk Dobrzański „Hubal”", in Hrubieszów
 Command Company
 6x Reconnaissance Companies
 Logistic Company
9th Warmiński Reconnaissance Regiment "Col. Zygmunt Szendzielarz „Łupaszka”", in Lidzbark Warmiński
 Command Company
 6x Reconnaissance Companies
 Logistic Company
18th Białystok Reconnaissance Regiment (unofficially "Carpathian Uhlans"), in Białystok
 Command Company
 6x Reconnaissance Companies
 Logistic Company
1st Brzeg Combat Engineer Regiment "Tadeusz Kościuszko", in Brzeg
 Command Company
 1st Engineer Battalion
 2nd Engineer Battalion
 3rd Engineer Battalion
 Technical Equipment Battalion
 Engineer Support Battalion
 Logistic Battalion
2nd Mazovian Combat Engineer Regiment, in Kazuń Nowy
 Command Company
 1st Engineer Battalion
 2nd Engineer Battalion
 3rd Bridging Battalion
 Technical Equipment Battalion
 Engineer Support Battalion
 Logistic Battalion
2nd Inowrocław Engineer Regiment "Gen. Jakub Jasiński", in Inowrocław
 Command Company
 1st Bridging Battalion
 2nd Engineer Battalion
 3rd Bridging Battalion
 Technical Equipment Battalion
 Engineer Support Battalion
 Logistic Battalion
5th Engineer Regiment "Gen. Ignacy Prądzyński", in Szczecin
 Command Company
 1st Engineer Battalion
 2nd Engineer Battalion
 3rd Engineer Battalion
 Technical Equipment Battalion
 Engineer Support Battalion
 Logistic Battalion
4th Brodnica CBRN defense Regiment "Ignacy Mościcki", in Brodnica
 Command Company
 1st CBRN defense Company
 2nd CBRN defense Company
 3rd CBRN defense Company
 CBRN Reconnaissance Company
 Decontamination Company
 Logistic Company
5th CBRN defense Regiment "Lt.-Gen. Leon Berbecki", in Tarnowskie Góry
 Command Company
 1st CBRN defense Company
 2nd CBRN defense Company
 3rd CBRN defense Company
 CBRN Reconnaissance Company
 Decontamination Company
 Logistic Company
2nd Przasnysz Radioelectronic Reconnaissance Regiment (Przasnysz)
 8th Grudziądz Radioelectronic Combat Bataillon ″Brigadier General Zygmunt Podhorski″ (Grudziądz)
Central Psychological Operations Group "King Stefan Báthory", in Bydgoszcz

Units and Formations attached to the Land Forces

Armed Forces Support Inspectorate 

 1st Pomeranian Logistic Brigade "Casimir the Great", in Bydgoszcz
 1st Command and Security Battalion, in Bydgoszcz
 1st Storage Battalion, in Ciechanów
 1st Logistic Battalion, in Bydgoszcz
 2nd Logistic Battalion, in Bydgoszcz
 3rd Logistic Battalion, in Glewice
 11th Transport Battalion, in Czarne
 52nd Maintenance Battalion, in Czarne
 112th Maintenance Battalion, in Giżycko
 10th Opole Logistic Brigade "Col. Piotr Wysocki", in Opole
 1st Logistic Battalion, in Opole
 2nd Logistic Battalion, in Opole
 10th Command and Security Battalion, in Opole
 10th Storage Battalion, in Opole
 55th Maintenance Battalion, in Opole
 82nd Transport Battalion, in Oleśnica
 91st Logistic Battalion, in Komprachcice
 National Support Component Headquarter, in Opole
 Medical Support Group, in Opole

Military Health Service Department 

1st Military Field Hospital, in Bydgoszcz
2nd Military Field Hospital, in Wrocław
 6th Medical Group, in Kraków
 10th Medical Support Group, in Świętoszów
 25th Medical Security Group, in Tomaszów Mazowiecki

Selected Land Forces elements, Armed Forces Operational Command

Multinational Corps North-East 
 Multinational Corps Northeast (MNC NE), in Szczecin, Polish Element
 MNC NE Support Brigade, in Stargard
 Brigade Command Company, in Stargard
 100th Signal Battalion, in Wałcz
 104th Support Battalion, in Wałcz
 Force Protection Company, in Szczecin (will expand to 102nd Force Protection Battalion, in case of war)
 Polish National Support Element, in Szczecin

Lithuanian–Polish–Ukrainian Brigade 
 LITPOLUKRBRIG, in Lublin
 LITPOLUKRBRIG Command Battalion, in Lublin

Independent units and formations

9th Command Support Brigade of the Armed Forces General Command 
The brigade is made up mostly of Land Forces personnel, but it is independent from the LF.

 9th Command Support Brigade of the Armed Forces General Command, in Białobrzegi
 5th Command Battalion "Maj.-Gen. Stanisław Haller", in Kraków
 Land Forces Command Battalion "2nd Lt. Stefan Szuby", in Białobrzegi
 6th Air Forces Command Battalion, in Śrem
 Naval Command Battalion "Col. Kazimierz Pruszkowski" Wejherowo
 Lublin Command Battalion "Romuald Traugutt" of the LITPOLUKRBRIG Multinational Brigade, in Lublin
 Command Systems Support Center of the Armed Forces General Command, in Białobrzegi

Warsaw Garrison Command 
The command is made up mostly of Land Forces personnel, but it is an independent formation.

 Warsaw Garrison Command, in Warsaw
 15th Sieradz Command Support Brigade, in Sieradz
 Brigade HQ
 1.Command Battalion
 1. Signals Battalion
 10th Wrocław Command Regiment, in Wrocław
 1. Średzki Command Battalion
 2. Wołowski Command Battalion
 3. Strzegocin Batalion Dowodzenia
 Jawor Logistical Battalion
 Security Regiment "Maj.-Gen. Bolesław Wieniawa-Długoszowski", in Warsaw
 1. Security Battalion
 2. Security Battalion
 Supply Battalion
 Representative Honor Guard Regiment of the Polish Armed Forces (honor guard), in Warsaw
 Regimental HQ
 1st Guards Battalion 
 Battalion HQ Company
 1 Honor Guard Company
 2 Honor Guard Company
 3 Honor Guard Company
 Support Unit
 Representative Central Band of the Polish Armed Forces
 State Honors Artillery Platoon
 Security Staff
 Presidential Horse Guard Mounted Ceremonial Squadron
 10th Warsaw Automobile Regiment "Maj. Stefan Bronisław Starzyński", in Warsaw
 Regiment HQ
 1. Transport Battalion
 2. Transport Battalion
 Logistical Battalion
 Supply Department Warsaw
 Capitol Garrison Supply Department, in Warsaw
 Warsaw Garrison Command Supply Department, in Warsaw
 Military Physical Training and Conditional Center, in Mrągowo
 24. Field Technical Base of the Signals Troops, in Szumirad
 Land Forces Band, in Wrocław
 Air Forces Band, in Poznań
 Representative Band of the Navy, in Gdynia
 15 military band stationed within military garrisons, in Bydgoszcz, Elbląg, Giżycko, Dęblin, Bytom, Żagań, Świnoujście, Lublin, Siedlce, Kraków, Toruń, Koszalin, Radom, Rzeszów and Szczecin
 Special Editions Printing Press of the General Staff, in Warsaw
 Warsaw Garrison Command Club, in Warsaw

Geographic distribution

References 

Polish Land Forces
Army units and formations of Poland